Solonikhino is a rural locality (a village) in Yenangskoye Rural Settlement, Kichmengsko-Gorodetsky District, Vologda Oblast, Russia. The population was 26 as of 2002.

Geography 
Solonikhino is located 77 km southeast of Kichmengsky Gorodok (the district's administrative centre) by road. Vasino is the nearest rural locality.

References 

Rural localities in Kichmengsko-Gorodetsky District